The men's halfpipe competition of the FIS Freestyle World Ski Championships 2013 was held at Tryvann Ski Resort, Oslo, Norway on March 4 (qualifying)  and March 5 (finals). 
33 athletes from 15 countries competed.

Qualification

The following are the results of the qualification.

Final
The following are the results of the final.

References

Halfpipe, men's